Honghe Mengzi Airport is a dual-use military and civil airport being built in Mengzi City, capital of the Honghe Hani and Yi Autonomous Prefecture in China's southwestern Yunnan province near the Vietnamese border.  The airport is located in Daguoxi Village (大郭西村), Yuguopu Subdistrict (雨过铺).

History
The airport was first proposed in 1999, but was repeatedly delayed due to complications with the military Mengzi Air Base.  On October 9, 2012 the project finally gained approvals from both the State Council and the Central Military Commission of China, with the decision to build a dual-use airport to replace the existing air base.  Construction was expected to begin by the end of 2012 with a total investment of 3 billion yuan. Eventually construction started on November 17, 2020.

See also
List of airports in China
List of the busiest airports in China
List of People's Liberation Army Air Force airbases

References

Airports in Yunnan
Chinese Air Force bases
Proposed airports in China
Transport in Honghe Hani and Yi Autonomous Prefecture